Cockburn Town is the capital of the Turks and Caicos Islands, spreading across most of Grand Turk Island. It was founded in 1681 by salt collectors.

Geography
Cockburn Town is located on the largest island in the Turks Islands  archipelago, Grand Turk Island. Historic 18th and 19th century Bermudian architecture lines Duke and Front Streets in the town. The town is known for its long, narrow streets and old street lamps.

The closest anchorage to Cockburn Town is Hawk's Nest Anchorage, which, though sheltered, should only be entered in good light because of reefs near the entrance.

History
The seat of government ever since 1766, Cockburn Town was the first permanent settlement on any of the islands, founded in 1681 by salt collectors who arrived in the Turks and Caicos Islands. The city supposedly lies on the place where Juan Ponce de León first landed on the island. It is named for Francis Cockburn, former Governor of the Bahamas.

Main sights

National Museum

Cockburn Town is home to the Turks & Caicos National Museum, which is housed in the colonial-era Guinep House, on Front Street.  The house is believed to be over 180 years old and much of its structural material came from local shipwrecks, including a ship's mast, which is one of the building's main supports.  The site was donated to the Museum in 1990.

Among the National Museum's collections is an exhibit of shipwrecks, including the oldest known European shipwreck in the Americas, the Molasses Reef Wreck, dated 1505.

Other exhibits detail the history of the Lucayans, the Space Race, Turks and Caicos postage stamps, slavery and the history of the slave trade, the sisal and salt industries, royal events, as well as a general history of the islands.  The museum also maintains a garden, which is adjacent to the Guinep House.

Also of interest are the museum's research projects, including its Message in a Bottle Project, recording nearly 40 years' worth of messages to wash upon the shores of Grand Turk.

Her Majesty's Prison
"Her Majesty's Prison" on Pond Street was built in the 1830s and remained in operation until 1994.  In addition to the main cell block and offices for prison officials, it hosts a bell tower and its own museum.

Climate 
Grand Turk has a hot semi-arid climate (Köppen BSh) with summer-like weather occurring all year round and a rainier season from September to December when the northeastern trade winds are strongest and hurricanes common.

Education
The sole high school is HJ Robinson High School.

See also 
 Grand Turk Parade Ground

References

External links

 
Populated places in the Turks and Caicos Islands
Capitals in the Caribbean
Populated places established in 1681
Capitals of British Overseas Territories
1681 establishments in the British Empire